Dicey Reilly is a traditional Irish song written by Dominic Behan at the start of the 20th century. It tells the tale of an alcoholic call girl from Dublin. There are various versions of the song with additional verses added by many artists, and most notably a version by Ronnie Drew in which Dicey Reilly appears in court.

The song is uncertain whether Dicey Reilly was a real person, or if she was entirely fictional.

References

Irish ballads
20th-century songs
The Dubliners songs
Year of song unknown